Kenneth William Donald  (1911–1994) was a British physician, surgeon, pulmonologist, cardiologist, professor of medicine, and leading expert on underwater physiology and exercise physiology.

Biography
After education at Emmanuel College, Cambridge and St Bartholomew's Hospital, he qualified MRCS, LRCP in 1936 and graduated MB BChir (Cantab.) in 1938. After house appointments he joined the Royal Navy in 1939. He was Surgeon Lieutenant aboard HMS Hotspur during the first naval Battle of Narvik in April 1940. He was awarded the DSC in June 1940.

Donald graduated MD in 1945. From 1946 to 1948 he worked at St Bartholomew's Hospital as chief assistant to Ronald Christie and worked with Christie's research group on the physiology of chronic lung disease. From 1948 to 1949 Donald was a Rockefeller fellow at Manhattan's Bellevue Hospital, where he worked with the Nobel prize winner André Cournand. Donald also collaborated there with Richard L. Riley (1911–2001) on research involving "ventilation-perfusion relationships and gas diffusion at the alveolo-capillary membrane of the lungs." After returning to England, Donald was from 1949 to 1950 a senior lecturer at the Royal Brompton Hospital. From 1950 to 1959 he was reader in medicine at the University of Birmingham Medical School. At Birmingham he did research on pulmonary circulation, with a team including John Bishop, Gordon Cumming (1922–2001), Archie C. Pincock, and Owen Lyndon Wade (1921–2008).

 
From 1959 to 1976 Donald held the chair of medicine at the University of Edinburgh. His predecessor was Sir Stanley Davidson. Donald was dean of the faculty of medicine for three years.

He gave the Bradshaw Lecture in 1958. He was elected FRCP in 1952 and FRCPE in 1960. He was from 1967 to 1976 physician to the Queen in Scotland and was from 1976 to 1977 president of the Association of Physicians of Great Britain and Ireland.

He retired in 1976. Upon his death he was survived by his widow.

Selected publications

with W. M. Davidson and W. O. Shelford: 
with J. M. Bishop, S. H. Taylor, and P. N. Wormald: 
with Lindsay A. G. Davidson and Cecil T. G. Flear: 

with A. Armstrong, Barbara Duncan, Michael Francis Oliver, Desmond Gareth Julian, Mary Fulton, W. Lutz, and S. L. Morrison:

References

1911 births
1994 deaths
Alumni of Emmanuel College, Cambridge
Alumni of the Medical College of St Bartholomew's Hospital
Academics of the University of Edinburgh
20th-century British medical doctors
Fellows of the Royal College of Physicians
Fellows of the Royal College of Physicians of Edinburgh